The 31st Producers Guild of America Awards (also known as 2020 Producers Guild Awards), honoring the best film and television producers of 2019, were held at the Hollywood Palladium in Hollywood, California on January 18, 2020. The nominations in the documentary category were announced on November 19, 2019, the nominations in the sports, children's and short-form categories were announced on December 19, 2019, and the remaining nominations for film and television were announced on January 7, 2020.

Winners and nominees

Film

Television

PGA Innovation Award

Milestone Award
 Ted Sarandos

Stanley Kramer Award
 Bombshell

Visionary Award
 Octavia Spencer

David O. Selznick Achievement Award in Theatrical Motion Pictures
 Brad Pitt, Dede Gardner, and Jeremy Kleiner

Norman Lear Achievement Award in Television
 Marta Kauffman

References

External links
 PGA Awards website

 2019
2019 film awards
2019 television awards